Victor Andrew de Bier Everleigh McLaglen (10 December 1886 – 7 November 1959) was a British boxer-turned-Hollywood actor. He was known as a character actor, particularly in Westerns, and made seven films with John Ford and John Wayne. McLaglen won the Academy Award for Best Actor in 1935 for his role in The Informer.

Early life
McLaglen claimed to have been born in Tunbridge Wells, Kent, although his birth certificate records 505 Commercial Road, Stepney in the East End of London as his true birthplace. His father, Andrew Charles Albert Mclaglen, was a missionary in the Free Protestant Church in South Africa, and was later a bishop of the Free Protestant Episcopal Church of England. 

The McLaglen family is ultimately of Scottish origin, descended from a MacLachlan who settled in South Africa in the 19th century. The name was rendered into McLaglen from Dutch pronunciation. A.C.A. McLaglen was christened Andries Carel Albertus McLaglen in Cape Town on 4 April 1851.

One of ten siblings, Victor had eight brothers and a sister. Four of his brothers also became actors: Arthur, an actor and sculptor, and Clifford, Cyril, and Kenneth.

Other siblings included Frederick, Lewis, and a sister, Lily. Another brother, Sydney Temple Leopold McLaglen, who appeared in one film, gained notoriety prior to World War I as a showman and self-proclaimed world jujutsu champion, who authored a book on the subject.

Victor moved with his family to South Africa for a time, where his father was Bishop of Claremont

Army service and boxing career
McLaglen left home at 14 to join the British Army with the intention of fighting in the Second Boer War, but much to his chagrin, he was stationed at Windsor Castle in the Life Guards and was later forced to leave the army when his true age was discovered.

Four years later, he moved to Winnipeg, Manitoba, Canada, where he became a local celebrity, earning a living as a wrestler and heavyweight boxer, with several notable wins in the ring. He also briefly served as a constable in the Winnipeg Police Force in 1907.

One of his most famous fights was against heavyweight champion Jack Johnson in a six-round exhibition bout at the Vancouver Athletic Club on 10 March 1909. This was Johnson's first bout since winning the heavyweight title from Tommy Burns. Between bouts, McLaglen toured with a circus, which offered $25 to anyone who could go three rounds with him.

He returned to Britain in 1913, and during the First World War served as a captain (acting) with the 10th Battalion, Middlesex Regiment. Later, he served with the Royal Irish Fusiliers. He served for a time as military assistant provost marshal for the city of Baghdad. He continued boxing, and was named heavyweight champion of the British Army in 1918.

After the war, he continued boxing, including a defeat at the hands of British champion Frank Goddard. His final fight was a loss by knockout to Arthur Townley in October 1920. He finished his professional career with a record of 16 wins, eight losses, and a draw.

Acting career

Britain
McLaglen was visiting a sporting club when spotted by a film producer who was looking for a boxer to play the lead in a film, The Call of the Road (1920). Although McLaglen had never acted before, he auditioned and got the part.

He was in the adventure films: Corinthian Jack (1921) and The Prey of the Dragon (1921). He followed it with The Sport of Kings (1921). Donald Crisp cast him in The Glorious Adventure (1922) and he was in A Romance of Old Baghdad (1922), Little Brother of God (1922), A Sailor Tramp (1922), The Crimson Circle (1922), The Romany (1922), and Heartstrings (1922).

McLaglen played leads in M'Lord of the White Road (1923), In the Blood (1923), The Boatswain's Mate (1923), Women and Diamonds (1924), and The Gay Corinthian (1924). He was in The Passionate Adventure (1924), co-written by Alfred Hitchcock, and The Beloved Brute (1924), The Hunted Woman (1925), and Percy (1925).

Hollywood
McLaglen's career took a surprise turn in 1925 when he moved to Hollywood. He became a popular character actor, with a particular knack for playing drunks. He also usually played Irishmen, leading many film fans to mistakenly assume he was Irish rather than English. McLaglen played one of the titular characters of The Unholy Three (1925) in Lon Chaney Sr.'s original silent version of the macabre crime drama.

McLaglen had a support part in Winds of Chance (1925), directed by Frank Lloyd, then made The Fighting Heart (1925) at Fox, directed by John Ford. Ford would have a major impact on McLaglen's career. McLaglen was in The Isle of Retribution (1925), Men of Steel (1926), and Beau Geste (1926), playing Hank in the last.

What Price Glory? and stardom

McLaglen was the top-billed leading man in director Raoul Walsh's First World War classic What Price Glory? (1926) with Edmund Lowe and Dolores del Río. The film was a huge success, making over $2 million, and Fox signed McLaglen to a long-term contract.

Fox put McLaglen in The Loves of Carmen (1927) with del Río, directed by Walsh. He was top-billed in Mother Machree (1928), directed by Ford. He was top-billed in A Girl in Every Port (1928), co-starring Robert Armstrong and Louise Brooks. He starred in Hangman's House (1928) for Ford, a romantic drama set in Ireland, and The River Pirate (1928), and Captain Lash (1929). McLaglen then made two films for Ford: Strong Boy (1929) and The Black Watch (1929).

Talking movies

McLaglen was one of many Fox stars who had cameos in the musical Happy Days (1929). He was reunited with Edmund Lowe and Raoul Walsh in a sequel to What Price Glory?, The Cock-Eyed World (1929), which was another huge success at the box office.

McLaglen made a musical with Walsh, Hot for Paris (1930), then made On the Level (1930). A Devil with Women (1931) was a buddy comedy with Humphrey Bogart in which Bogart played McLaglen's sidekick. He was borrowed by Paramount for Dishonored (1931), starring Marlene Dietrich and directed by Joseph von Sternberg. He was in Not Exactly Gentlemen (1931) and had a cameo in the short film The Stolen Jools (1931). McLaglen, Lowe, and Walsh reunited for a second sequel to What Price Glory?, Women of All Nations (1931). He was in Annabelle's Affairs (1931), Wicked (1931), The Gay Caballero (1932), and Devil's Lottery (1932). McLaglen and Lowe went to Paramount for Guilty as Hell (1932).

Back at Fox he was in Rackety Rax (1932) then made a fourth What Price Glory? film with Lowe, Hot Pepper (1933). McLaglen starred in Laughing at Life (1933) and returned to Britain to make Dick Turpin (1933).

McLaglen starred opposite Boris Karloff's crazed religious fanatic in John Ford's The Lost Patrol (1934) at RKO, a picture about desperate soldiers gradually losing their minds fighting Arabs in the desert of what is now Iraq.

At Paramount, McLaglen and Lowe were in No More Women (1934) (a non-What Price Glory? film), then McLaglen made Wharf Angel (1934). He was one of many stars in Murder at the Vanities (1934). At Columbia, McLaglen starred in The Captain Hates the Sea (1934) with John Gilbert.  Lowe and he reunited at Fox for Under Pressure (1935) (directed by Walsh) and The Great Hotel Murder (1935).

The Informer

Another highlight of his career was winning an Academy Award for Best Actor for his role in Ford's The Informer (1935), shot at RKO, based on a novel of the same name by Liam O'Flaherty. Frank Tashlin's 1938 cartoon Have You Got Any Castles? features a caricature of McLaglen emerging from the novel and literally informing someone about some shady characters. In 1945, McLaglen said that winning the Oscar had no economic benefit and that he didn't know where it was because his son had taken it to college for use as a paperweight.

Back at Fox – now 20th Century Fox – McLaglen made Professional Soldier (1935) with Freddie Bartholomew. At Paramount, he was teamed with Mae West in Klondike Annie (1936), then he went back to Fox for Under Two Flags (1936) with Rosalind Russell and Ronald Colman.

McLaglen starred in The Magnificent Brute (1936) for Universal, Sea Devils (1937) for RKO and Nancy Steele Is Missing! (1937) for Fox. He stayed at Fox to support Robert Taylor in This Is My Affair (1937), and notably, Shirley Temple in Wee Willie Winkie (1937) directed by John Ford at Fox. He had a cameo in Ali Baba Goes to Town (1937).  Brian Donlevy and he made a comedy Battle of Broadway (1938) at Fox, then he went to Universal for The Devil's Party (1938).

Gunga Din

McLaglen returned to Britain for We're Going to Be Rich (1938) with Gracie Fields. Back in Hollywood, he did some films for RKO: Pacific Liner (1939) and Gunga Din (1939). The latter, with Cary Grant and Douglas Fairbanks Jr., was an adventure epic loosely based on Rudyard Kipling's poem that served as the template decades later for Indiana Jones and the Temple of Doom (1984).

He supported Nelson Eddy in Let Freedom Ring (1939) at MGM, and was in Ex-Champ (1939). He supported Brian Aherne in Captain Fury (1939), and starred in Full Confession (1939) for John Farrow at RKO, the latter film being somewhat a remake of The Informer.

At Universal, McLaglen teamed with Basil Rathbone in Rio (1939) and Jackie Cooper in The Big Guy (1939). He was top-billed in Edward Small's South Seas adventure, South of Pago Pago (1940). He remained top-billed for Diamond Frontier (1940) and Broadway Limited (1941).

McLaglen and Lowe reprised their roles from What Price Glory? in the radio program Captain Flagg and Sergeant Quirt, broadcast on the Blue Network (28 September 1941 – 25 January 1942, and on NBC 13 February 1942 – 3 April 1942).

McLaglen and Lowe then played basically the same roles, but under different names in Call Out the Marines (1942) at RKO. He starred in Powder Town (1942), and went to Fox to support Gene Tierney in China Girl (1942). He was one of many stars in Forever and a Day (1943), and had a support role in Tampico (1943) and Roger Touhy, Gangster (1944). McLaglen was a villain in Bob Hope's The Princess and the Pirate (1944), and he was in Rough, Tough and Ready.

Supporting actor
McLaglen began to be exclusively a supporting actor, with parts in Love, Honor and Goodbye (1945), Whistle Stop (1946) with George Raft and Ava Gardner, Calendar Girl (1947), The Michigan Kid (1947), and The Foxes of Harrow (1947).

McLaglen was back with John Ford for Fort Apache (1948) with John Wayne and Henry Fonda. It was very much a support part, as a cavalry sergeant, but so well received that McLaglen basically reprised it in the other two films in the Ford-Wayne "cavalry trilogy": She Wore a Yellow Ribbon (1949) and Rio Grande (1950) with Maureen O'Hara and Ben Johnson.

McLaglen was later nominated for another Oscar, this time for a Best Supporting Actor for his role opposite John Wayne in The Quiet Man (1952). He continued to be in demand as a support actor in action films: Fair Wind to Java (1953) with Fred MacMurray and Prince Valiant (1954) with James Mason and Robert Wagner. He went to Britain for Trouble in the Glen (1954), an unsuccessful attempt to do for Scotland what The Quiet Man did for Ireland. Back in Hollywood, he was in Many Rivers to Cross (1955) at MGM with Robert Taylor and Eleanor Parker.

Later career
McLaglen had a rare late career lead role in City of Shadows (1955) at Republic with Patricia Crowley, and he was second-billed in Bengazi (1955), but he went back to supports with Lady Godiva of Coventry (1955). He had a cameo in Around the World in 80 Days (1956) with David Niven and Cantinflas, then had another lead in The Abductors (1957), directed by his son, Andrew V. McLaglen.

Toward the end of his career, McLaglen made several guest appearances on television, particularly in Western series such as Have Gun, Will Travel and Rawhide. The episodes in which McLaglen guest-starred were both directed by his son, Andrew, who later became a film director frequently directing John Wayne.

He went to Italy for Gli Italiani sono matti and had a good part in Sea Fury (1958), shot in England with Stanley Baker.

Activism
In 1933, he founded the California Light Horse Regiment, which included a "riding parade club, a polo-playing group and a precision motorcycle contingent". He described it in a press interview as promoting "Americanism". He said it was organized to fight communists and others "opposed to the American ideal", both inside and outside the country. McLaglen was attacked by some on the left as fascist, which he denied. He said he was a "patriot of the good old-fashioned American kind".

Personal life
 
In 1935, McLaglen spent a reported $40,000 (equal to $ today) his own stadium near Riverside Drive and Hyperion Avenue, near Griffith Park and the Atwater Village neighborhood of Los Angeles. The stadium was used for football and many other activities. The Los Angeles River flood of 1938 seriously damaged the stadium, and it fell into disuse thereafter. In 1941, he was selected as the grand marshal of the Clovis Rodeo parade in Clovis, California.

McLaglen was married three times. He first married Enid Lamont in 1919. The couple had two sons, Andrew, Walter, and one daughter, Sheila. Andrew McLaglen was a television and film director who worked on several film projects with John Wayne. Andrew's children, Mary and Josh McLaglen, are both film producers and directors. Sheila's daughter, Gwyneth Horder-Payton, is a television director. Enid Lamont McLaglen died in 1942 as a result of a horse-riding accident.

His second marriage was to Suzanne M. Brueggeman. That marriage lasted from 1943 until 1948. His third and final marriage was to divorcée Margaret McNichols Pumphrey, a Seattle socialite he married in 1948. They remained married until his death of a heart attack in 1959.

He had by that time become a naturalized U.S. citizen. His cremated remains are interred at Forest Lawn Memorial Park, Glendale, in the Garden of Memory, Columbarium of Eternal Light.

On 8 February 1960, McLaglen received a star on the Hollywood Walk of Fame at 1735 Vine Street, for his contributions to the motion-picture industry.

McLaglen spoke five languages, including Arabic.

Filmography

See also

 List of actors with Academy Award nominations
 List of bare-knuckle boxers

References

External links

 
 
 McLaglen's Record at Cyber Boxing Zone
 Photographs of Victor McLaglen
 Portrait of Victor McLaglen, Los Angeles, 1930s. Los Angeles Times Photographic Archive (Collection 1429). UCLA Library Special Collections, Charles E. Young Research Library, University of California, Los Angeles.
 Victor McLaglen: A Man as Big as the Screen

1886 births
1959 deaths
20th-century American male actors
20th-century English male actors
American male boxers
American male film actors
American male silent film actors
Bare-knuckle boxers
Best Actor Academy Award winners
British Army personnel of World War I
British Life Guards soldiers
Burials at Forest Lawn Memorial Park (Glendale)
English male film actors
English male silent film actors
English male boxers
English people of Scottish descent
Male actors from London
Male Western (genre) film actors
Middlesex Regiment officers
People from Stepney
Vaudeville performers
Western (genre) television actors
British emigrants to the United States
Naturalized citizens of the United States
British expatriates in Canada